The 59th Primetime Creative Arts Emmy Awards honored the best in artistic and technical achievement in American prime time television programming from June 1, 2006, until May 31, 2007, as chosen by the Academy of Television Arts & Sciences. The awards were presented on September 8, 2007, in a ceremony hosted by Carlos Mencia at the Shrine Auditorium in Los Angeles, California. The ceremony was broadcast by E! on September 15, preceding the 59th Primetime Emmy Awards on September 16. A total of 80 Creative Arts Emmys were presented across 66 categories.

Bury My Heart at Wounded Knee received five wins from 11 nominations, leading all programs in both wins and nominations. Planet Earth and Tony Bennett: An American Classic tied for the second-most awards with four each, followed by Jane Eyre, Rome, and When the Levees Broke: A Requiem in Four Acts with three each. The 60th Annual Tony Awards, Ghosts of Abu Ghraib, Kathy Griffin: My Life on the D-List, A Lion in the House, Nick News with Linda Ellerbee, Planet Earth, South Park, When the Levees Broke, and Where's Lazlo? won Emmys in their respective overall program fields. HBO was the most-recognized network, receiving 15 awards from 53 nominations.

Winners and nominees

Winners are listed first, highlighted in boldface, and indicated with a double dagger (‡). Sections are based upon the categories listed in the 2006–2007 Emmy rules and procedures. Area awards and juried awards are denoted next to the category names as applicable. For simplicity, producers who received nominations for program awards have been omitted.

Programs

Performing

Animation
{| class="wikitable"
|+ 
|-
| style="vertical-align:top;" | 
 Avatar: The Last Airbender: "Lake Laogai" – Sang-Jin Kim (Nickelodeon) Billy & Mandy's Big Boogey Adventure (The Grim Adventures of Billy & Mandy) – Phil Rynda (Cartoon Network) Camp Lazlo: "Squirrel Secrets" – Sue Mondt (Cartoon Network) Class of 3000: "Eddie's Money" – David Colman (Cartoon Network) Eloise: "Me, Eloise" – James McDermott (Starz Kids & Family) Family Guy: "No Chris Left Behind" – Steve Fonti (Fox) Good Wilt Hunting (Foster's Home for Imaginary Friends) – Dave Dunnet (Cartoon Network) Moral Orel: "The Lord's Prayer" – Sihanouk Mariona (Cartoon Network) My Gym Partner's a Monkey: "The Big Field Trip" – Narina Sokolova (Cartoon Network) Robot Chicken: "Lust for Puppets" – Thomas Smith (Cartoon Network)|}

Art Direction
{| class="wikitable"
|+ 
|-
| style="vertical-align:top;" width="50%" | 
 How I Met Your Mother: "Aldrin Justice" / "Something Borrowed" / "Something Blue" – Steve Olson and Susan Eschelbach (CBS) The Class: "Pilot" – Glenda Rovello and Peter Gurski (CBS)
| style="vertical-align:top;" width="50%" | 
 Rome: "Heroes of the Republic" / "Philippi" / "Deus Impeditio Esuritori Nullus" – Joseph Bennett, Anthony Pratt, Carlo Serafini, and Cristina Onori (HBO) Deadwood: "Tell Your God to Ready for Blood" / "True Colors" / "Amateur Night" – Maria Caso, David Potts, and Ernie Bishop (HBO)
 Heroes: "Genesis" – Curtis A. Schnell, Daniel J. Vivanco, and Crista Schneider (NBC)
 Shark: "Teacher's Pet" – Suzuki Ingerslev, Cat Smith, and Rusty Lipscomb (CBS)
 The Tudors: "Episode 101" – Tom Conroy, Alan Gilmore, and Eliza Solesbury (Showtime)
 Ugly Betty: "The Box and the Bunny" – Mark Worthington, Jim Wallis, and Archie D'Amico (ABC)
|-
| style="vertical-align:top;" width="50%" | 
 Jane Eyre (Masterpiece Theatre) – Grenville Horner, Patrick Rolfe, and Clare Andrade (PBS) Broken Trail – Ken Rempel, Bill Ives, and Paul Healy (AMC)
 Bury My Heart at Wounded Knee – Ian Thomas, D.A. Menchions, and Paul Healy (HBO)
 Return to Halloweentown – Edward L. Rubin and Kenneth J. Kirchner (Disney Channel)
 The Starter Wife – Tracey Gallacher, Brian Edmonds, and Rolland Pike (USA)
| style="vertical-align:top;" width="50%" | 
 79th Annual Academy Awards – J. Michael Riva, Gregory Richman, and Tamlyn Wright (ABC) Tony Bennett: An American Classic – John Myhre, Tomas Voth, and Barbara Cassel (NBC) Cirque Du Soleil: Corteo – Jean Rabasse (Bravo)
 Desperate Crossing: The Untold Story of the Mayflower – Katha Seidman and Kent Lanigan (The History Channel)
 Engineering an Empire: "Egypt" – Preeya Jensen (The History Channel)
 Hell's Kitchen: "Episode 210" – John Janavs, Robert Frye, and Dawn Sinko (Fox)
 MADtv: "Episode 1209" – John Sabato, D Martyn Bookwalter, and Daryn Reid Goodall (Fox)
|}

Casting
{| class="wikitable"
|+ 
|-
| style="vertical-align:top;" width="50%" | 
 Ugly Betty – Libby Goldstein and Junie Lowry Johnson (ABC) 30 Rock – Jennifer McNamara (NBC)
 Desperate Housewives – Junie Lowry Johnson and Scott Genkinger (ABC)
 Entourage – Sheila Jaffe and Georgianne Walken (HBO)
 Weeds – Amy McIntyre Britt and Anya Colloff (Showtime)
| style="vertical-align:top;" width="50%" | 
 Friday Night Lights – Linda Lowy, John Brace, and Beth Sepko (NBC) Brothers & Sisters – Jeanie Bacharach and Gillian O'Neill (ABC)
 Grey's Anatomy – Linda Lowy and John Brace (ABC)
 Studio 60 on the Sunset Strip – Elizabeth Barnes, Francine Maisler, and Liberman/Patton Casting (NBC)
 The Tudors – Nuala Moiselle, Frank Moiselle, Mary Jo Slater, and Steven Brooksbank (Showtime)
|-
| style="vertical-align:top;" width="50%" colspan="2" | 
 Broken Trail – Wendy Weidman, Coreen Mayrs, Heike Brandstatter, Jackie Lind, and Fiorentino/Mangieri/Weidman Casting (AMC) Bury My Heart at Wounded Knee – Rene Haynes, Rhonda Fisekci, and Candice Elzinga (HBO)
 Jane Eyre (Masterpiece Theatre) – Di Carling (PBS)
 The Path to 9/11 – Meg Liberman, Cami Patton, Robin D. Cook, Nicole Hilliard-Forde, and Suzanne M. Smith (ABC)
 The Ron Clark Story – Gary M. Zuckerbrod, Lonnie Hamerman, Bonnie Finnegan, Rhonda Fisekci, and Candice Elzinga (TNT)
 The Starter Wife – Mary Jo Slater, Steven Brooksbank, and Tom McSweeney (USA)
|}

Choreography
{| class="wikitable"
|+ 
|-
| style="vertical-align:top;" | 
 So You Think You Can Dance: "Calling You" – Mia Michaels (Fox) So You Think You Can Dance: "Ramalama (Bang Bang)" – Wade Robson (Fox) Tony Bennett: An American Classic – John DeLuca and Rob Marshall (NBC) Dancing with the Stars: "Episode 303" – Louis Van Amstel (ABC)
|}

Cinematography
{| class="wikitable"
|+ 
|-
| style="vertical-align:top;" width="50%" | 
 Two and a Half Men: "Release the Dogs" – Steven Silver (CBS) According to Jim: "Hoosier Daddy" – George Mooradian (ABC)
 Rules of Engagement: "Jeff's Wooby" – Wayne Kennan (CBS)
| style="vertical-align:top;" width="50%" | 
 Rome: "Passover" – Alik Sakharov (HBO) CSI: Crime Scene Investigation: "Built to Kill (Part One)" – Michael Slovis (CBS)
 Deadwood: "Catbird Seat" – Joseph E. Gallagher (HBO)
 The Sopranos: "Soprano Home Movies" – Phil Abraham (HBO)
 Studio 60 on the Sunset Strip: "Pilot" – Thomas Del Ruth (NBC)
|-
| style="vertical-align:top;" width="50%" | 
 Bury My Heart at Wounded Knee – David Franco (HBO) Broken Trail: "Part 1" – Lloyd Ahern (AMC)
 Jane Eyre (Masterpiece Theatre): "Part 1" – Mike Eley (PBS)
 The Path to 9/11: "Night 2" – Joel Ransom (ABC)
 The Valley of Light (Hallmark Hall of Fame Presentation) – Eric Van Haren Noman (CBS)
| style="vertical-align:top;" width="50%" | 
 Planet Earth: "Pole to Pole" – Doug Allan, Martyn Colbeck, Paul Stewart, Simon King, Michael Kelem, and Wade Fairley (Discovery Channel) Deadliest Catch: "The Unforgiving Sea" – Doug Stanley, Zac McFarlane, Don Bland, Cameron Glendenning, Todd Stanley, and Eric Lange (Discovery Channel)
 Meerkat Manor: "Family Affair" – John Brown and Robin Smith (Animal Planet)
 This American Life: "God's Close-Up" – Adam Beckman (Showtime)
 When the Levees Broke: A Requiem in Four Acts – Cliff Charles (HBO)
|-
| style="vertical-align:top;" width="50%" colspan="2" | 
 The Amazing Race: "I Know Phil, Little Ol' Gorgeous Thing" – Per Larsson, John Armstrong, Sylvester Campe, Petr Cikhart, Tom Cunningham, Chip Goebert, Bob Good, Peter Rieveschl, Dave Ross, Uri Sharon, and Alan Weeks (CBS) Dirty Jobs: "Mule Logger" – Douglas Glover, Troy Paff, and Christopher Whiteneck (Discovery Channel)
 Intervention: "Sylvia" – Chris Baron, Meri Pritchett, and Jamie Hall (A&E)
 Project Runway: "Iconic Statement" – Tony Sacco (Bravo)
 Top Chef: "Episode 209" – Craig Spirko and Gus Dominguez (Bravo)
|}

Commercial

Costumes

Directing
{| class="wikitable"
|+ 
|-
| style="vertical-align:top;" | 
 When the Levees Broke: A Requiem in Four Acts – Spike Lee (HBO)'''
 Ghosts of Abu Ghraib – Rory Kennedy (HBO)
 Star Wars: The Legacy Revealed – Kevin Burns (The History Channel)
 Thin – Lauren Greenfield (HBO)
 This American Life: "God's Close-Up" – Christopher Wicha (Showtime)
|}

Hairstyling

Lighting Direction
{| class="wikitable"
|+ 
|-
| style="vertical-align:top;" | 
 49th Annual Grammy Awards – Robert A. Dickinson, Matt Firestone, and Andy O'Reilly (CBS)' 79th Annual Academy Awards – Robert A. Dickinson, Robert Barnhart, and Andy O'Reilly (ABC)
 American Idol: "The Finale" – Kieran Healy, George Harvey, and Harry Sangmeister (Fox)
 Dancing with the Stars: "Episode 308" – Simon Miles (ABC)
 Late Night with Conan O'Brien: "Episode 2408" – Fred Bock, Ronnie Skopac, and Eugene Meienhofer (NBC)
|}

Main Title Design
{| class="wikitable"
|+ 
|-
| style="vertical-align:top;" | 
 'Dexter – Eric Anderson, Josh Bodnar, Lindsay Daniels, and Colin Davis (Showtime) Hu$tle – Joe Berger and Pascal Wyse (AMC)
 The Lost Room – Thomas Cobb, Robert Bradley, and Patrick Loungway (Sci Fi Channel)
 The Path to 9/11 – Matthew Mulder, Dave Molloy, Colin Day, and Lindsay Daniels (ABC)
 Standoff – Michael Riley, Bob Swensen, Dan Meehan, and Brad Simmons (Fox)
 Ugly Betty – Garson Yu and Yolanda Santosa (ABC)
|}

Makeup

Music

Picture Editing

Sound Editing

Sound Mixing

Special Visual Effects

Stunt Coordination

Technical Direction

Writing
{| class="wikitable"
|+ 
|-
| style="vertical-align:top;" | 
 American Masters: "Andy Warhol: A Documentary Film" – James Sanders and Ric Burns (PBS)' Penn & Teller: Bullshit!: "Wal-Mart" – Penn Jillette, Teller, Sheryl Zohn, Jon Hotchkiss, Michael Goudeau, Star Price, Cliff Schoenberg, and David Weiss (Showtime)
 Planet Earth: "Mountains" – Vanessa Berlowitz and Gary Parker (Discovery Channel)
 Star Wars: The Legacy Revealed – Steven Smith, David Comtois, and Kevin Burns (The History Channel)
 This American Life: "God's Close-Up" – Nancy Updike (Showtime)
|}

Special awards
Governors Award
The Governors Award, recognizing an individual or group "whose works stand out with the immediacy of current achievement", was presented to two programs:
 American Idol''s "Idol Gives Back" (Fox) was recognized for raising "more than $75 million to benefit relief programs for children and young people in extreme poverty in America and Africa".
 The Addiction Project (HBO) was "an unprecedented multi-platform and outreach campaign [...] aimed at helping Americans understand addiction as a chronic but treatable brain disease".

Outstanding Achievement in Engineering Development
One Emmy Award, four plaques, and one certificate of recognition were presented to recognize engineering achievements:
 The Charles F. Jenkins Lifetime Achievement Award was presented to Howard A. Anderson for his visual effects work.
 Plaques for Outstanding Achievement in Engineering Development went to TM Systems' QC Station, Osram Sylvania Products' OSRAM HMI Metal Halide Lamp Technology, Digital Vision's DVNR Image Processing Hardware-DVO Image Process Software, and Silicon Optix's Teranex Video Computer.
 A Certificate of Achievement, recognizing a historic contribution to television technology, was presented to Sycom for its work on the varicap.

Syd Cassyd Founders Award
The Syd Cassyd Founders Award was presented to Rich Frank, former television executive and president of the Television Academy, for his "significant positive impact on the Academy through [his] efforts and service over many years of involvement".

Nominations and wins by program
For the purposes of the lists below, any wins in juried categories are assumed to have a prior nomination.

Nominations and wins by network

Presenters
The following individuals presented awards at the ceremony:

 Kristen Bell
 David Boreanaz
 Billy Ray Cyrus
 Miley Cyrus
 Tim Daly
 Josh Duhamel
 Omar Epps
 America Ferrera
 Tom Green
 Seth Green
 Greg Grunberg
 Marcia Gay Harden
 Neil Patrick Harris
 Bob Iger
 Rex Lee
 Mekhi Phifer
 Jennifer Morrison
 Rob Morrow
 Emily Procter
 Yeardley Smith
 Maura Tierney
 Stanley Tucci
 Blair Underwood
 Michael Urie
 Rainn Wilson

Ceremony information

The 59th Primetime Creative Arts Emmy Awards were executive produced by Lee Miller and John Moffitt, produced by Spike Jones Jr. through his company SJ2 Entertainment, and directed by Chris Donovan. Comedian Carlos Mencia was announced as the host in August. Nominations were announced on July 19, a week later than usual due to changes in voting rules. The awards were presented on September 8 in a four-hour ceremony at the Shrine Auditorium in Los Angeles, which was then edited into a two-hour broadcast shown on E! on September 15, the day before the main ceremony on Fox.

Major rule changes for this year's Creative Arts categories included:
 Public performances taped for television were moved from Outstanding Variety, Music, or Comedy Special to Outstanding Special Class Program.
 Broadband programs were allowed to compete in categories alongside cable and broadcast programs.
 So-called "dangling" episodes – episodes of an eligible program airing outside of the eligibility window – now qualified for awards in the same year that the program was competing. Previously, such episodes were ineligible for any awards.

Notes

References

External links
 59th Primetime Creative Arts Emmy Awards at Emmys.com
 
 Academy of Television Arts and Sciences website

059 Creative Arts
2007 in American television
2007 in Los Angeles
2007 awards in the United States
2007 television awards
September 2007 events in the United States